Kraków School of Economics, also known as the Kraków School or KSE was a school of economic thought centred around the Jagiellonian University and most prominent in interwar Poland. The school was critical of economic interventionism and statism prominent during the sanation and instead favoured free markets and free trade.

Some of the school's members, such as Adam Heydel and Roman Rybarski were tied to the national democratic movement.

The school had connections to the Austrian School, with the member Adam Heydel adopting a similar methodology.

List of members 

 Adam Heydel
 
 Ferdynand Zweig

 Leon Oberlender
 Roman Rybarski
 Stanisław Wyrobisz

See also 

 Liberalism in Poland
 National liberalism
 Janusz Korwin-Mikke

References

External links 

 „Dzieła zebrane” Adama Heydla (The Complete works of Adam Heydel)
Works of Roman Rybarski at Polona.pl

National Democracy
Economic liberalism
Jagiellonian University
Schools of economic thought
Libertarianism in Europe
Libertarian theory